The Philosophical Review is a quarterly journal of philosophy edited by the faculty of the Sage School of Philosophy at Cornell University and published by Duke University Press (since September 2006).

Overview
The journal publishes original work in all areas of analytic philosophy, but emphasizes material that is of general interest to academic philosophers. Each issue of the journal contains approximately two to four articles along with several book reviews. According to a poll conducted on Leiter Reports, the Philosophical Review is considered the best general journal of philosophy in the English language.

The journal has been in continuous publication since 1892. Volume I contained articles by William James and John Dewey.

Notable articles

See also 
 List of philosophy journals

Notes

External links 
The Philosophical Review
Sage School of Philosophy

Philosophy journals
Cornell University
Duke University Press academic journals
Contemporary philosophical literature
1892 establishments in the United States
Publications established in 1892
Philosophy Documentation Center academic journals